Weekly Alibi, commonly referred to as The Alibi, was a free weekly news, arts, culture, and entertainment newspaper and website in Albuquerque, New Mexico. The main features were the website's award-winning news section, featuring cultural commentary by August March; the calendar listings; reviews and guides to arts; art criticism; entertainment news; music interviews; and film reviews by noted film critic/Managing Editor Devin O'Leary. Its "Chowtown" restaurant guide and its "Best of Burque" award issues, which covered everything from "Best Community Action Group" and "Best All-You-Can-Eat" to "Best Gay Bar" were popular features of Weekly Alibi.

Originally the newspaper was a bi-weekly newspaper called NuCity, but changed its name due to a similar Chicago newspaper entitled Newcity.

The newspaper and website were members of the Association of Alternative Newsmedia as well as the National Newspaper Association.

The Weekly Alibi is closed; its last edition was published in late August, 2020.

See also
Local iQ

References

External links

Newspapers published in New Mexico
Defunct newspapers published in New Mexico
Mass media in Albuquerque, New Mexico
Publications with year of establishment missing
Weekly newspapers published in the United States